Mauritia eglantina, the 'dog-rose cowry' or 'eglantine cowry', is a species of sea snail, a cowry, a marine gastropod mollusk in the family Cypraeidae, the cowries.

Subspecies
 Mauritia eglantina huberi Thach, 2018

Description
These cowries are rather elongated, smooth and shiny. The basic color of the dorsum is brown, with clear spots and many thin longitudinal lines. Almost in the middle of the dorsum there is a clearer longitudinal band. The base may be white, pale pink or pale brown. The edges show several brown dots. The teeth of the aperture are well developed. Mauritia eglantina can be easily confused with Mauritia arabica. In the living cowry the mantle is brown and thin.

Distribution
Mauritia eglantina is a species of Eastern Indian Ocean and Western Pacific Ocean, ranging from eastern Polynesia and Micronesia, Samoa Islands, New Caledonia up to Southeast Asia, Indonesia, Philippines and Northern Australia.

Habitat

References

External links
 Natural History Museum of Rotterdam : photo
 Mauritia eglantina
 
 M. eglantina
 Biolib

Cypraeidae
Gastropods described in 1833